Weyhe is a municipality in the district of Diepholz, Lower Saxony, Germany. It is situated approximately 15 km south of Bremen.

History
First mentioned in 860, when a sick girl from "Wege" travelled to the grave of Saint Willehad in Bremen. Legend has it that she was cured by a miracle.
However, it was not until 1 March 1974 when the municipally was officially christened as "Weyhe". That day, the nine smaller municipalities Kirchweyhe, Leeste, Lahausen, Sudweyhe, Erichshof, Melchiorshausen, Dreye, Jeebel and Ahausen were united.

Education
In the western part there is the KGS Leeste, in the eastern part the KGS Kirchweyhe. These schools are part of the Gesamtschule (comprehensive school) system which employs all three traditional tracks in German education; Hauptschule, Realschule, and Gymnasium.

Twin towns – sister cities

Weyhe is twinned with:

 Cesvaine, Latvia
 Coulaines, France
 Ērgļi, Latvia
 Lubāna, Latvia
 Madona, Latvia
 Varakļāni, Latvia

Notable people
Louise Ebert (1873–1955), wife of Friedrich Ebert, the first president of the Weimar Republic
Katja Riemann (born 1963), actress
Michael Rosemann (born 1967), professor and Honorary Consul in Brisbane, Australia
Hermann Rumsfeld, great-great-grandfather of former U.S. Secretary of Defense Donald Rumsfeld

References

External links

Diepholz (district)